The Mountaineer is a newspaper based in Waynesville, North Carolina. The newspaper is owned by The Mountaineer Publishing Company.

References

External links
Official website

Haywood County, North Carolina
Newspapers published in North Carolina